The 2018 African Women's Handball Champions League was the 40th edition, organized by the African Handball Confederation, under the auspices of the International Handball Federation, the handball sport governing body. The tournament was held from October 19–28, 2018 in Abidjan, Ivory Coast, contested by 9 teams and won by Clube Desportivo Primeiro de Agosto of Angola.

Draw

Preliminary round

Times given below are in CET UTC+1.

Group A

* Note:  Advance to quarter-finals

Group B

* Note:  Advance to quarter-finals

Knockout stage

Championship bracket

5-8th bracket

Quarter-finals

5–8th classification

Semi-finals

7th place

5th place

3rd place

Final

Final ranking

See also
 2018 African Women's Handball Cup Winners' Cup
 2018 African Women's Handball Championship

References

External links
 Official website

2018 African Women's Handball Champions League
2018 African Women's Handball Champions League
African Women's Handball Champions League
Handball in Ivory Coast